Six Hours at Pedernales is a studio album by the country singer Willie Nelson and Step One Records co-founder Curtis Potter.

Critical reception

Texas Monthly wrote: "Unfortunately, it's full of slick swing, fat synths, flabby snare drums, Potter's Robert Goulet–style crooning ... and there’s no sign of [Nelson's guitar] Trigger."

Track listing 
"Nothing's Changed, Nothing's New" (Ray Pennington) - 3:46
"Chase the Moon" (Sharon Pennington, Jesse Shofner) - 2:27
"Are You Sure" (Buddy Emmons, Willie Nelson) - 2:27
"The Party's Over" (Willie Nelson) - 2:26
"We're Not Talking Anymore" (Mel Holt) - 2:34
"Turn Me Loose & Let Me Swing" (Ray Pennington) - 2:51
"Once You're Past the Blues" (Mel Holt) - 3:01
"It Won't Be Easy" (Don Silvers) - 3:52
"Stray Cats, Cowboys, & Girls of the Night" (Jesse Shofner) - 2:43
"The Best Worst Thing" (Ray Pennington)  - 3:50
"It Should Be Easier Now" (Willie Nelson) - 3:20
"My Own Peculiar Way" (Willie Nelson) - 2:54

Personnel
Willie Nelson - Guitar, vocals
Bobby All - Acoustic guitar
Roger Ball - Acoustic guitar
Gene Chrisman - Drums
Buddy Emmons - Steel guitar
Gregg Galbraith - Electric guitar
Rob Hajacos - Fiddle
Bunky Keels - Piano
Brent Mason - Electric guitar
Curtis Potter - Vocals, performer
Gary Prim - Keyboards
David Smith - Guitar
Kristin Wilkinson - Strings

References

1994 albums
Willie Nelson albums
Step One Records albums